Amar Singh Club Ground is ground in Srinagar, Jammu and Kashmir. The ground is part of the Amar Singh Club which was in the year 1933.  The ground was named memory of after Raja Amar Singh by his son Maharaja Hari Singh. The ground is located in the 10 acre of land with facilities of one tennis court, badminton court and two Squash courts as well as 12 rooms. The ground has hosted cricket matches from 1960 and 1999 since then cricket in not played the ground. The ground was home of Jammu and Kashmir cricket team when they made a first-class debut and hosted 39 matches as well as a List A matches.

References

External links
 Cricket Archive
 cricinfo

Cricket grounds in Jammu and Kashmir
Sports venues in Jammu and Kashmir
Sport in Srinagar
Buildings and structures in Srinagar
Defunct cricket grounds in India
Sports venues completed in 1960
1960 establishments in Jammu and Kashmir
20th-century architecture in India